WRC 5 is a racing video game based on the 2015 World Rally Championship season. The game was developed by French developer Kylotonn and published by Bigben Interactive for Microsoft Windows, PlayStation 4, PlayStation 3, Xbox One, Xbox 360, and PlayStation Vita platforms in October 2015. It is the first game in the series developed by Kylotonn. This is the final installment of WRC for PS3 and Xbox 360.

It is the first WRC game for eighth generation consoles and as the official video game of the 2015 World Rally Championship season features cars and rallies from the 2015 season, including support categories, and a total of 400 km of stages. The game also featured British indie rock band Bastille's song "Pompeii" in its intro.

Reception

IGN said: "A restart from scratch for the WRC series, but does not leave a mark in the mud of the World Rally Championship". PlayStation Official Magazine – UK described the game as "rough around the edges, yet with plenty of fun to be had". Game Informer wrote: "While WRC 5 offers a decent experience, it lacks bite or any distinguishing characteristics".

The game reached number 10 in the UK retail sales chart, and number 10 in the downloads chart.

References

External links 

Video games developed in France
World Rally Championship video games
PlayStation 3 games
PlayStation 4 games
Windows games
Xbox 360 games
Xbox One games
PlayStation Vita games
Multiplayer and single-player video games
Multiplayer online games
Kylotonn games
2015 video games
Nacon games